Armatosterna buquetiana is a species of beetle in the family Cerambycidae. It was described by White in 1856, originally under the genus Tragocephala. It is known from Nigeria, Cameroon, the Ivory Coast, Benin, Ghana, Liberia, Sierra Leone, Guinea, and Togo.

References

Tragocephalini
Beetles described in 1856